Lesbian, gay, bisexual, and transgender (LGBT) people in  Guinea face legal challenges not experienced by non-LGBT residents. Both male and female same-sex sexual activity is illegal in Guinea.

Law regarding same-sex sexual activity

The Guinean Penal Code provides as follows.

 Article 325.
Any indecent act or act against nature committed with an individual of the same sex will be punished by imprisonment of six months to three years and a fine of 100,000 to 1,000,000 Guinean francs. If the act was committed with a minor under 21 years of age, the maximum sentence must be pronounced. If the act was consummated or attempted with violence or attempted violence, the guilty person will be condemned to five to ten years of imprisonment.

 Article 326.
A public indecency is defined as any intentional act committed publicly and likely to offend the decency and the moral sentiments of those who are its inadvertent witnesses.

 Article 327.
Any person that has committed a public indecency will be punished by three months to two years of imprisonment and a fine of 50,000 to 450,000 Guinean francs or simply by one of these two punishments.

When an indecent act is committed by a group of individuals, the penalties described in the first paragraph of the current article will be doubled.

Recognition of same-sex unions

There is no recognition of same-sex unions.

Adoption and family planning
A couple married for a minimum of five years or an unmarried person who is at least 30 years of age is eligible to adopt a Guinean child if there is at least 15 years between the age of the child and the age of the adopting parent. Guinean law does not specifically make LGBT persons ineligible to adopt.

Living conditions
The U.S. Department of State's 2011 Human Rights Report found that in 2011,
There were deep social, religious, and cultural taboos against homosexual conduct. There were no official or NGO reports of discrimination against individuals based on their sexual orientation or gender identity. Nevertheless, during the 2010 opening of the Office of the High Commissioner for Human Rights in Conakry, the prime minister announced his belief that consensual same sex sexual activity is wrong and should be forbidden by law. He also said that sexual orientation should not be regarded as a basic human right. There were no active lesbian, gay, bisexual, or transgender organizations.

Summary table

See also

Human rights in Guinea

General:
LGBT rights in Africa
Human rights in Africa

References 

Guinea
Law of Guinea
Politics of Guinea
LGBT in Guinea
Human rights in Guinea